Big Swan Creek is a stream in Hickman, Lewis and Lawrence counties, in the U.S. state of Tennessee. Variant names are Swan Creek and West Fork Swan Creek. Big Swan Creek is a tributary of the Duck River.

The creek was named from an incident when hunters killed a swan at the creek before 1800.

See also
List of rivers of Tennessee

References

Rivers of Hickman County, Tennessee
Rivers of Lawrence County, Tennessee
Rivers of Lewis County, Tennessee
Rivers of Tennessee